Gyeongsang National University (GNU, 경상대학교) is one of ten Flagship Korean National Universities located in Jinju, South Gyeongsang Province.

Gyeongsang National University has twelve colleges such as arts, social science, natural science, engineering, agriculture and life science, management, veterinary, education, nursing, and medicine and eight graduate schools such as medicine and public health, business administration, education, aerospace, industry etc. Other institutions with the university are the university library, university museum, student center, university newspaper, broadcasting center, publishing company, institute for education of science talented, Korean language cultural center and so on. The current statistics of Gyeongsang National University shows that it has 1,681 academic staffs including 808 full-time professors, 361 administrative staffs and 24,502 students including undergraduate and graduate students enrolled. The university has three campuses and two of these are located in Jinju, South Gyeongsang Province and the other is located in Tongyeong. The main campus is located at Gajwa-Dong in the city of Jinju, Chilam campus, Jinju has the college of medicine, and Tongyeong campus, an hour from Jinju by car, has the college of Marine Science.

The motto of Gyeongsang National University(GNU) is Pioneer, and it states that the eyes of pioneers see far beyond the present to the future. The history of the university begun as Jinju Agricultural College founded in Jinju in 1948, then, accredited as national college in 1968 and in 1972, renamed as Gyeongsang National College. In 1980, the college was accredited as a national university by the ministry of education and renamed as Gyeongsang National University. For more than 60 years since its foundation, Gyeongsang National University has been educating talented students who have served not only for local community but also for national prosperity by leading them to be bigger asset in many places such as communities, industries, businesses and around the country and the world.

Gyeongsang National University is well known for many achievements in applied life science along with biochemistry, agricultural science, and veterinary. One of these is that the researchers at the university discovered a way to make cloned Turkish Angora cats glow red when exposed to ultraviolet light in 2007.

The Graduate School of Medicine and Public Health at Gyeongsang National University is a medical training and research institution in South Gyeongsang Province. Gyeongsang National University Hospital was open with 419 beds in 1987 as the university hospital of Gyeongsang National University and is located next to the college of medicine in Chilam campus and has grown to a general and multispecialty medical hospital with 950 beds operating with specialty centers such as the local cancer center opened as the first local cancer center of its kinds in the country and rheumatoid arthritis center. Gyeongsang National University Hospital at Changwon is newly open as the second Gyeongsang National University hospital in February, 2016. The university hospital at Changwon has begun with 208 beds and is going to grow according to the number of patients hospitalized.

Overview of GNU's past and present

October 20, 1948:  Founded as Jinju Agricultural College by the provincial government of South Gyeongsang
July 11, 1972:  Accredited as Gyeongsang National College
March 1, 1975:  Established the graduate school
March 1, 1980:  Accredited as Gyeongsang National University by the government of Republic of Korea
March 1, 1983:  Established the College of Medicine
February 21, 1987:  Inaugurated the Gyeongsang National University Hospital
March 1, 1988:  Established the Graduate School of Business and Public Administration
March 1, 1989:  Established the College of Veterinary Medicine
March 1, 1993:  Established the College of Business Administration
March 1, 1995:  Established the College of Marine Science by merging the Tong-Yeong Junior College of Fisheries
March 1, 1996:  Established the Graduate School of Industry
March 1, 2010:  Graduate School of Public Health established
December 16, 2011 :  Dr. Kwon Soon Ki appointed 9th President
March 1, 2014:  GNU has 10 Graduate Schools, 12 colleges, 3 Divisions (5 majors) and 87 Departments, with a total of 3,252 new Students every year

Campus 

Gyeongsang National University has four campuses. Two campuses are located in Jinju, one campus in Tongyeong, and one campus in Changwon. Gajwa campus is located in Gajwa-dong, Jinju close to the junction of Tongyeong–Daejeon Expressway and Namhae Expressway, Chilam campus is located in Chilam-dong right next to Nam River, Tongyeong campus is located in Inpyeong-dong, Tongyeong, and Changwon campus is located in Uichang-gu, Changwon.

Gajwa Campus
Gajwa campus is the main campus of Gyeongsang national university. Most buildings and facilities of the university including the university headquarter, the student center, and buildings for the colleges of arts, social science, law, education, business administration, natural science, agriculture and life science, engineering, veterinary, and graduate schools are located in the campus. The area of Gajwa campus is more than 1,300,000 m2, and buildings numbered are more than sixty .

Chilam Campus
The gyeongsang national university hospital, unique facility for training of medical students and nurses, are also located in the campus. The area of the campus is 103,000 m2, and buildings such as dormitory, student center, and the medical library, are located.

Tongyeong Campus
The college of marine science is located in Inpyeong-dong, Tongyoung. The campus is home of ten departments for marine science in the college and has fifteen buildings including the college headquarter, education and research center, gym, library, student center, and female dormitory. The area of the campus is 147,000 m2.

Changwon Campus
Changwon Campus is the industry-university convergence campus, founded in 2017. Department of Mechanical Convergence Engineering is the only department that is located in Changwon Campus.

Academic colleges 

College of Agriculture and Life Science
College of Law
College of Education
College of Veterinary

Chilam Campus
College of Nursing
College of Medicine

Tongyeong Campus
College of Marine Science

Changwon Campus
Headquarters campus

Graduate schools of professional studies
Graduate School of Medicine 
Graduate School of Business 
Graduate School of Education 
Graduate School of Convergence Science & Technology
Graduate School of Public Administration
Graduate School of Aerospace Specialization
Graduate School of Public Health
Graduate School of Food & Medicine

Master's programs
Humanities and social sciences
Natural sciences
Engineering
Medicine
Arts and athletics
Interdisciplinary departments
Industrial-academic collaboration
Contract department

Doctoral programs
Humanities and social sciences
Natural sciences
Engineering
Medicine
Arts and athletics
Interdisciplinary departments
Industrial-academic collaboration

Joint masters and doctoral programs
Humanities and social sciences
Natural sciences
Engineering
Medicine
Arts and athletics
Interdisciplinary departments

See also
Flagship Korean National Universities
List of national universities in South Korea
List of universities and colleges in South Korea
Education in Korea

References

External links 
 Official site of Gyeongsang National University (In English)
 Official site of Gyeongsang National University (In Korean)
 Office of International and External Cooperation (OIEC)
 Gyeongsang National University Library (In English)
 The Pioneer Magazine

Universities and colleges in South Gyeongsang Province
National universities and colleges in South Korea
Jinju
Educational institutions established in 1948
1948 establishments in Korea